This is a list of episodes for the fourteenth season (1963–64) of the television version of The Jack Benny Program.

Episodes

References

External links

 
 

1963 American television seasons
1964 American television seasons
Jack 14